C. mertensii may refer to:
 Carex mertensii, the Mertens' sedge, a plant species
 Chaetoceros mertensii, H.L. Honigmann, a marine planktonic diatom species in the genus Chaetoceros
 Chaetodon mertensii, the atoll butterflyfish, a species of butterflyfish found in the Pacific Ocean